FK Lepenec is a football club based in the village of Bardovci near Skopje, North Macedonia. They currently play in the OFS Skopje league.

History
The club was founded in 1963. Club was named after the river of Lepenac which flows in the Bardovci.

The biggest achievement of the club was the winning of Macedonian Third League two times in 2008 and 2009.

References

External links
Club info at MacedonianFootball 
Football Federation of Macedonia 

Lepenec
Association football clubs established in 1963
1963 establishments in the Socialist Republic of Macedonia